Larry Mason (30 July 1935 – 12 August 2004) was a Canadian speed skater. He competed in three events at the 1960 Winter Olympics. In December 1962, he went to Europe as part of the national team composing of eight Canadian speed skaters, for a six-week training project in Sweden.

References

External links
 

1935 births
2004 deaths
Canadian male speed skaters
English emigrants to Canada
Olympic speed skaters of Canada
Sportspeople from Kendal
Speed skaters at the 1960 Winter Olympics